Choi Yu-jin (born August 12, 1996), known mononymously as Yujin, is a South Korean singer and actress. Originally debuting in 2015 as a member of the South Korean girl group CLC, she is currently active as a member and leader of Kep1er after finishing in third place in the final episode of the survival show Girls Planet 999. Yujin began her acting career in 2016 in a supporting role in the Naver TV web drama, Nightmare High.

Early life
Yujin was born on August 12, 1996, in Jeonju, North Jeolla Province, South Korea. She attended high school at Hanlim Multi Art School and graduated in February 2015.

Career

Pre-debut
She is the longest-serving trainee among CLC members, having been a trainee for over 4 years prior to her debut in 2015.

As a trainee, Yujin created and taught BtoB's Ilhoon the 'Gwiyomi Player' aegyo, which he would later popularise on the South Korean Idol variety show, Weekly Idol. In 2013, South Korean singer, Hari released "Gwiyomi Song" inspired by the gesture Yujin created.

In 2013, Yujin collaborated with then-Cube artist Yang Yo-seob in "Perfume" which was released on April 30 as part Cube Entertainment's first "Voice Project". She was credited under the pre-debut group Cube Girls.

In 2014, alongside three of the soon-to-be CLC members, Sorn, Seungyeon and Yeeun, Yujin appeared in BtoB's "Beep Beep" music video. In the same year, all five of the original members of CLC appeared in G.NA's "G.NA's Secret" music video and participated in promotional activities as backing dancers. In 2015, the quintet did a voluntary street busking performances to help children with developmental disabilities and has been attracting attention as a warm 'Hongdae idol' as part of their pre-debut activities. They released a self-composed song "You're My Love" on March 13, 2013, through the online music site Melon and the official YouTube channel.

2015–2020: Debut with CLC and acting debut

On March 13, 2015, Cube Entertainment released the profile information and images of Yujin, as the fourth member of CLC following Yeeun, Sorn, and Seungyeon, through their official social media. In Cube's words: Choi Yu-jin, who has all the visual elements to be called a 'heavenly idol', aims to become the strongest idol's 'proportioner' with an unusual physical condition. She was introduced as a vocalist and dancer of the group and can cross various genres such as belly dance, popping, rocking, and house dance with a high understanding and expressiveness of dance performance. Along with member Seungyeon, she is considered to be one of CLC's 'top two  dancers'. Yujin and fellow CLC members were also chosen as the new model for a Korea's clothing brand, SMART Uniform, alongside Got7 and B1A4.

Yujin made her debut as a member of CLC on May 19, 2015, with the release of the single "Pepe" off the five-track EP First Love, of which all the proceeds were donated to children with developmental disabilities.

On August 17, 2015, she joined the cast of Real Man for the third season's female soldier special as the youngest member among the ten entertainers including rapper Jessi, Japanese broadcaster Sayuri Fujita and former national tennis player Jeon Mi-ra. She gained wider recognition after joining the show, where she drew attention over her small face and slender body frame, measuring 162 cm and 42 kg, taking first place in push-ups despite her skinny arms that couldn't even measure blood pressure. Later, she went viral with the caption "Choi Yu-jin's 3-stage transformation into a female soldier" from a 'pretty and fresh girl' to a 'dignified baby soldier' for which she received the nickname "Baby Soldier" and "Patriotic Idol" from soldiers of the Armed Forces and viewers of the show. Yujin's appearance on the show ended in late September 2015. At the end of the year, Yujin shared a stage with cast member Jessi and Kim Hyun-sook performing S.E.S' "I'm Your Girl" at the 2015 MBC Entertainment Awards.

In 2016, Yujin made her acting debut in the Naver TV web drama Nightmare High as Cheon Yoo-na. The same year, she was cast as one of the female leads in Green Fever, a prequel to Lily Fever (2015). She plays the role of a rookie actor who has emerged as the nation's little sister and is the only actress affiliated with Jin Entertainment. She worked with Kim Hye-jun and Jung Yeon-joo.

2021–present: Girls Planet 999, debut with Kep1er, and CLC's disbandment

In 2021, Yujin made a cameo in the Netflix drama, So Not Worth It. In June 2021, Yujin joined the Mnet survival show Girls Planet 999 as one of the program's 33 Korean contestants. She consistently ranked in the Top 9 as the show progressed and ultimately finished in 3rd place, allowing her to debut with the winning group, Kep1er. On December 3, 2021, it was revealed that Yujin would be starring on the web drama Pumpkin Time where it would premiere December 14, 2021. On May 20, 2022, Cube Entertainment announced that CLC has disbanded.

Discography

Singles

Production credits

Filmography

Web series

Television shows

Music video appearances

Awards and nominations

Notes

References

External links

 
 

Living people
People from Jeonju
1996 births
Cube Entertainment artists
CLC (group) members
Kep1er members
Hanlim Multi Art School alumni
21st-century South Korean women singers
K-pop singers
21st-century South Korean actresses
South Korean women rappers
South Korean female idols
South Korean web series actresses
Girls Planet 999 contestants
Reality show winners
Swing Entertainment artists
Yu-jin